Slim Mahfoudh (19 January 1942 – 30 July 2017) was a Tunisian actor. He acted on the stage, in feature films like L'Étoile du Nord and on television series like Al Khottab Al Bab and Choufli Hal.

References

External links
 

1940s births
2017 deaths
20th-century Tunisian male actors
21st-century Tunisian male actors
Tunisian male stage actors
Tunisian male television actors
Tunisian male film actors